Cellulite is the herniation of subcutaneous fat within fibrous connective tissue that manifests as skin dimpling and nodularity, often on the pelvic region (specifically the buttocks), lower limbs, and abdomen. Cellulite occurs in most postpubescent females. A review gives a prevalence of 85–98% of women, indicating that it is physiological rather than pathological. It can result from a complex combination of factors ranging from hormones to heredity.

Causes 
The causes of cellulite include changes in metabolism, physiology, diet and exercise habits, obesity, sex-specific dimorphic skin architecture, alteration of connective tissue structure, hormonal factors, genetic factors, the microcirculatory system, the extracellular matrix, and subtle inflammatory alterations.

Hormonal factors
Hormones play a dominant role in the formation of cellulite. Estrogen may be the important hormone in the development of cellulite. However, there has been no reliable clinical evidence to support such a claim. Other hormones—including insulin, the catecholamines adrenaline and noradrenaline, thyroid hormones, and prolactin—are believed to participate in the development of cellulite.

Genetic factors
There is a genetic element in individual susceptibility to cellulite. Researchers have traced the genetic component of cellulite to particular polymorphisms in the angiotensin converting enzyme (ACE) and hypoxia-inducible factor 1A (HIF1a) genes.

Predisposing factors
Several factors have been shown to affect the development of cellulite. Sex, ethnicity, biotype, distribution of subcutaneous fat, and predisposition to lymphatic and circulatory insufficiency have all been shown to contribute to cellulite.

Lifestyle
A high-stress lifestyle causes an increase in the level of catecholamines, which have also been associated with the development of cellulite.

Treatments 
Cellulite is a multifactorial condition, and can be resistant to an array of treatments. Aside from 'topical' products (creams, ointments) and injectables (collagenase), treatments for cellulite include non-invasive therapy such as mechanical suction or mechanical massage. Energy-based devices include radio frequency with deep penetration of the skin, ultrasound, cryotherapy chambers, laser and pulsed-light devices. Combinations of mechanical treatments and energy-based procedures are widely used. More invasive 'subcision' techniques utilise a needle-sized microscalpel to cut through the causative fibrous bands of connective tissue. Subcision procedures (manual, vacuum-assisted, or laser-assisted) are performed in specialist clinics with patients given local anaesthetic.

Epidemiology 
Cellulite is thought to occur in 80–90% of post-adolescent females. There appears to be a hormonal component to its presentation. Its existence as a real disorder has been challenged and the prevailing medical opinion is that it is merely the "normal condition of many women". It is rarely seen in males, but is more common in males with androgen-deficient states, such as Klinefelter's syndrome, hypogonadism, postcastration states and in those patients receiving estrogen therapy for prostate cancer.

History 
The term was first used in the 1920s by spa and beauty services to promote their services, and began appearing in English-language publications in the late 1960s, with the earliest reference in Vogue magazine, "Like a swift migrating fish, the word cellulite has suddenly crossed the Atlantic." The medicalization of cellulite (treating it like a medical problem) was popular for a time, as it drove sales of cosmetic treatments.

References

Further reading

External links 

 

Cosmetic surgery
Skin
Tissues (biology)
Women's health
Secondary sexual characteristics